Center Township is one of the twelve townships of Williams County, Ohio, United States.  The 2000 census found 3,056 people in the township.

Geography
Located in the southern part of the county, it borders the following townships:
Superior Township - north
Jefferson Township - northeast corner
Pulaski Township - east
Washington Township, Defiance County - southeast corner
Farmer Township, Defiance County - southwest corner
Milford Township, Defiance County - south
St. Joseph Township - west
Florence Township - northwest corner

A small section of the county seat of Bryan is located in eastern Center Township, and the unincorporated communities of Melbern and Williams Center lie in the township's west and southeast respectively.

Name and history
Center Township was organized in 1836, and was so named on account of its location near the geographical center of Williams County before the county was reduced in size. It is one of nine Center Townships statewide.

Government
The township is governed by a three-member board of trustees, who are elected in November of odd-numbered years to a four-year term beginning on the following January 1. Two are elected in the year after the presidential election and one is elected in the year before it. There is also an elected township fiscal officer, who serves a four-year term beginning on April 1 of the year after the election, which is held in November of the year before the presidential election. Vacancies in the fiscal officership or on the board of trustees are filled by the remaining trustees.

References

External links
County website

Townships in Williams County, Ohio
Townships in Ohio